The 2015–16 Anaheim Ducks season was the 23rd season for the National Hockey League franchise that was established on June 15, 1993. The team's regular season began on October 10, 2015, against the San Jose Sharks. The Ducks battled back from 1–7–2 and 12–15–6 starts to win 46 games and the Pacific Division, but were dispatched in a home playoff Game 7 for the fourth year in a row, as Nashville bested Anaheim in a hard-fought opening-round series.  The first round loss came a season after the Ducks went two rounds further in the playoffs to the Western Conference Finals. The Ducks terminated the employment of head coach Bruce Boudreau two days after the team's elimination.

Standings

Schedule and results

Pre-season

Regular season

Playoffs

Player statistics 
Final stats
Skaters

Goaltenders

†Denotes player spent time with another team before joining the Ducks.  Stats reflect time with the Ducks only.
‡Denotes player was traded mid-season.  Stats reflect time with the Team only.
Bold/italics denotes franchise record.

Suspensions/fines

Awards and honours

Awards

Milestones

Transactions
Following the end of the Ducks' 2014–15 season, and during the 2015–16 season, this team has been involved in the following transactions:

Trades

Free agents acquired

Free agents lost

Claimed via waivers

Lost via waivers

Lost via retirement

Player signings
The following players were signed by the Ducks. Two-way contracts are marked with an asterisk (*).

Draft picks

Below are the Anaheim Ducks' selections at the 2015 NHL Entry Draft, to be held on June 26–27, 2015, at the BB&T Center in Sunrise, Florida.

Draft notes

 The Anaheim Ducks' second-round pick went to the Columbus Blue Jackets as the result of a trade on March 2, 2015 that sent James Wisniewski and Detroit's third-round pick in 2015 to Anaheim in exchange for Rene Bourque, William Karlsson and this pick.
  The New York Rangers' second-round pick went to the Anaheim Ducks as the result of a trade on June 27, 2015 that sent Emerson Etem and Florida's second-round pick in 2015 to New York in exchange for Carl Hagelin, a sixth-round pick in 2015 and this pick.
  The Detroit Red Wings' third-round pick went to the Anaheim Ducks as the result of a trade on March 2, 2015 that sent Rene Bourque, William Karlsson and a second-round pick in 2015 to Columbus in exchange for James Wisniewski and this pick.
  The Vancouver Canucks' third-round pick went to the Anaheim Ducks as the result of a trade on June 27, 2014 that sent Nick Bonino, Luca Sbisa and a first and third-round pick in 2014 to Vancouver in exchange for Ryan Kesler and this pick.
 The Anaheim Ducks' third-round pick went to the Florida Panthers as the result of a trade on February 28, 2015 that sent Tomas Fleischmann to Anaheim in exchange for Dany Heatley and this pick.
 The Anaheim Ducks' fourth-round pick went to the Tampa Bay Lightning as the result of a trade on June 29, 2014 that sent Nate Thompson to Anaheim in exchange for a seventh-round pick in 2015 and this pick.
  The New York Rangers' sixth-round pick went to the Anaheim Ducks as the result of a trade on June 27, 2015 that sent Emerson Etem and a second-round pick in 2015 (From New Jersey via Florida) to New York in exchange for the rights to Carl Hagelin, a second-round pick in 2015 and this pick.
 The Anaheim Ducks' seventh-round pick went to the Edmonton Oilers as the result of a trade on June 27, 2015 that sent Dallas' seventh-round pick in 2016 to Tampa Bay in exchange for this pick.
Tampa Bay previously acquired this pick as the result of a trade on June 29, 2014 that sent Nate Thompson to Anaheim in exchange for a fourth-round pick in 2015 and this pick.

References

Anaheim Ducks seasons
Ana
Mighty Ducks of Anaheim
Mighty Ducks of Anaheim